The 2015 West Coast Conference men's basketball tournament was held March 6–10, 2015 at the Orleans Arena in Paradise, Nevada. The winner of the tournament received the conference's automatic bid into the 2015 NCAA tournament.

Seeds
WCC Tiebreaker procedures are as follows:
Head-to-head
Better record against a higher seed
Higher RPI

* Overall record at end of regular season.

Schedule

Bracket
All non-ESPN games will be shown online on TheW.tv.

Game summaries

San Francisco vs. Pacific
Series History: San Francisco leads 54-27
Broadcasters: Dave McCann and Blaine Fowler

Santa Clara vs. Loyola Marymount
Series History: Santa Clara leads 84-59
Broadcasters: Dave McCann and Blaine Fowler

Saint Mary's vs. Portland
Series History: Saint Mary's leads 60-29
Broadcasters: Dave McCann and Blaine Fowler (BYUtv)
Barry Tompkins, Casey Jacobsen, and Kelli Tennant (WCC TV)

Pepperdine vs. San Diego
Series History: Pepperdine leads 59-41
Broadcasters: Dave McCann and Blaine Fowler (BYUtv)
Barry Tompkins, Casey Jacobsen, and Kelli Tennant (WCC TV)

Gonzaga vs. San Francisco
Series History: Gonzaga leads 50-22
Broadcasters: Beth Mowins and Stan Heath

BYU vs. Santa Clara
Series History: BYU leads 23-5
Broadcasters: Beth Mowins and Stan Heath

Gonzaga vs. Pepperdine
Series History: Gonzaga leads 48-31
Broadcasters: Beth Mowins, Stan Heath, and Jeff Goodman

BYU vs. Portland
Series History: BYU leads 12-1
Broadcasters: Beth Mowins, Stan Heath, and Jeff Goodman

WCC Championship: Gonzaga vs. BYU
Series History: Gonzaga leads 8–4
Broadcasters: Dave Pasch, Sean Farnham, and Jeff Goodman (ESPN)
Kevin Calabro & Bill Frieder (Westwood One)

See also
2014-15 NCAA Division I men's basketball season
West Coast Conference men's basketball tournament
2014–15 West Coast Conference men's basketball season
2015 West Coast Conference women's basketball tournament

References

Tournament
West Coast Conference men's basketball tournament
West Coast Athletic Conference men's basketball tournament
West Coast Athletic Conference men's basketball tournament
Basketball competitions in the Las Vegas Valley
College basketball tournaments in Nevada
College sports tournaments in Nevada